This is a list of single-artist museums, which are museums displaying the work of, or bearing the name of, a single visual artist.

 Basuki Abdullah – Basoeki Abdullah Museum, Jakarta, Indonesia
 Affandi – Affandi Museum, Yogyakarta, Indonesia
 Yaacov Agam – Yaacov Agam Museum of Art, Rishon LeZion, Israel
 Ivan Aivazovsky - Aivazovsky National Art Gallery, Feodosia, Crimea
 Josef and Anni Albers – Josef and Anni Albers Foundation, Bethany, Connecticut
 Theodor Aman - Theodor Aman Museum, Bucharest, Romania
 Walter Anderson – Walter Anderson Museum of Art, Ocean Springs, Mississippi
 Edward Bailey – Bailey House Museum, Wailuku, Maui, Hawaii
 Ernst Barlach - Ernst Barlach House, Hamburg, Germany
 Frédéric Auguste Bartholdi – Musée Bartholdi, Colmar, France, and the Statue of Liberty Museum on Liberty Island, New York City
 Benini - Museo Benini, Marble Falls, Texas
 Rosa Bonheur - Musée de l'atelier Rosa Bonheur, Thomery, France
 Fernando Botero – Museo Botero, Bogota, Colombia
 Antoine Bourdelle – Musée Bourdelle, Paris
 Charles Burchfield – Burchfield Penney Art Center, Buffalo, New York
 Alexander Calder - Calder Gardens (upcoming), Philadelphia, Pennsylvania 
 Antonio Canova - Museo Canova, Possagno, Italy
 Paul Cezanne - Cézanne's studio, Aix-en-Provence, France
 Auguste Chabaud – Musée Auguste Chabaud, Provence-Alpes-Côte d'Azur
 Marc Chagall – Musée Marc Chagall, Nice, France, and Marc Chagall Museum, Vitebsk, Belarus
 Nek Chand - Rock Garden of Chandigarh, India
 Dale Chihuly – Chihuly Garden and Glass, Seattle, Washington
 Giorgio de Chirico - Giorgio de Chirico House Museum, Rome
 Camille Claudel – Musée Camille Claudel, Nogent-sur-Seine, France
 Jean Cocteau Museum, Menton, France
 Gustave Courbet – Musée Courbet, Ornans, France.
 Salvador Dalí – see list of Dalí museums
 Cyrus Edwin Dallin - Cyrus Dallin Art Museum, Arlington, Massachusetts 
 Eugène Delacroix – Musée national Eugène Delacroix, Paris
 Paul Delvaux – Paul Delvaux Museum, Saint-Idesbald, Belgium
 Charles Demuth – Demuth Museum, Lancaster, Pennsylvania
 Maurice Denis – Musée départemental Maurice Denis "The Priory", Paris
 Axel Petersson Döderhultarn - Döderhultarn Museum, Oskarshamn, Sweden
 Burhan Dogancay – Dogancay Museum, Istanbul, Turkey
 Jean Dubuffet – Fondation Jean Dubuffet, Paris
 El Greco - El Greco Museum, Toledo, Spain
 Monir Shahroudy Farmanfarmaian – Monir Museum, Tehran, Iran
 Nicolai Fechin - Taos Art Museum at Fechin House, Taos, New Mexico
 Dan Flavin - The Dan Flavin Art Institute, Bridgehampton, New York
 Marià Fortuny – Fortuny Museum, Venice
 Tony Foster – The Foster Museum, Palo Alto, California
 Jean-Honoré Fragonard – Villa Musée Jean-Honoré Fragonard, Grasse, France
 Marshall Fredericks - Marshall M. Fredericks Sculpture Museum, University Center, Michigan 
 Daniel Chester French - Chesterwood, Stockbridge, Massachusetts
 Ernst Fuchs - Ernst Fuchs Private Museum, Vienna, Austria
 Thomas Gainsborough - Gainsborough's House, Sudbury, England
 Antoni Gaudí – Gaudi House Museum, Barcelona, Spain
 Paul Gauguin – Paul Gauguin Museum, Tahiti
 William Glackens – Glackens Wing of the Museum of Art Fort Lauderdale, Fort Lauderdale, Florida
 Ilya Glazunov – Ilya Glazunov Moscow State Art Gallery, Moscow, Russia
 Nahum Gutman - Nahum Gutman Museum of Art, Neve Tzedek, Tel Aviv, Israel
 Jean-Jacques Henner - Musée national Jean-Jacques Henner, Paris, France
 Robert Henri - Robert Henri Museum, Cozad, Nebraska
 Barbara Hepworth – Barbara Hepworth Museum, Cornwall, England
 Bror Hjorth – Bror Hjorths Hus, Uppsala, Sweden
 Edna Hibel - Hibel Museum of Art, Jupiter, Florida 
 William Hogarth – Hogarth's House, London
 Grace Hudson – Grace Hudson Museum, Ukiah, California
 Friedensreich Hundertwasser - KunstHausWien, Vienna, Austria
 Jean Auguste Dominique Ingres – Musée Ingres, Montauban, France
 Asger Jorn – Museum Jorn, Silkeborg, Denmark
 Frida Kahlo – Frida Kahlo Museum, Mexico City, Mexico
 Paul Klee – Zentrum Paul Klee, Bern, Switzerland
 Georg Kolbe – Georg Kolbe Museum, Berlin, Germany
 Käthe Kollwitz – Käthe Kollwitz Museum, Cologne, Germany, Käthe Kollwitz Museum (Berlin), and the Käthe Kollwitz House (Moritzburg)
 Yayoi Kusama – Yayoi Kusama Museum, Tokyo, Japan
 Le Corbusier – Fondation Le Corbusier, Paris
 Johannes Larsen - Johannes Larsen Museum, Kerteminde, Denmark 
 Adrien-Jean Le Mayeur - Le Mayeur Museum, Sanur, Bali, Indonesia
 Fernand Léger – Musée National Fernand Léger, Biot, France
 Max Liebermann - Liebermann Villa, Berlin
 Frederic Leighton – Leighton House Museum, London
 Baltasar Lobo – Museo Baltasar Lobo, Zamora, Spain
 August Macke - August-Macke-Haus, Bonn, Germany
 René Magritte – Magritte Museum, Bruxelles, Belgium, and René Magritte Museum, Brussels 
 Aristide Maillol – Musée Maillol, Paris, and the Musée Maillol Banyuls-sur-Mer
 José Malhoa - José Malhoa Museum, Caldas da Rainha, Portugal 
 César Manrique – César Manrique Foundation, Lanzarote, Canary Islands
 Franz Marc – Franz Marc Museum, Kochel, Bavaria, Germany
 Henri Matisse - Musée Matisse, Nice, France, and Matisse Museum in Le Cateau-Cambrésis, France
 R. Tait McKenzie – Mill of Kintail, Mississippi Mills, Ontario
 Henrique Medina - Medina Museum, Braga, Portugal
 Gari Melchers - Gari Melchers Home and Studio, Falmouth, Virginia
 Michelangelo - Casa Buonarroti Florence, Italy
 Leo Michelson - Michelson Museum of Art, Marshall, Texas
 Carl Milles – Millesgården, Stockholm, Sweden
 Joan Miró – Fundació Joan Miró, Barcelona, Spain, and the Fundació Pilar i Joan Miró in Mallorca
 Paula Modersohn-Becker – Paula Modersohn-Becker Museum, Bremen, Germany
 Claude Monet – Musée Marmottan Monet, Paris, and Fondation Monet in Giverny
 Thomas and Mary Nimmo Moran – The Thomas and Mary Nimmo Moran House & Studio, East Hampton, New York
 Gustave Moreau – Musée national Gustave Moreau, Paris
 William Morris - William Morris Gallery, London
 Edvard Munch – Munch Museum, Oslo
 Elisabet Ney – Elisabet Ney Museum, Austin, Texas
 Isamu Noguchi – Noguchi Museum, New York City
 George Ohr – Ohr-O'Keefe Museum of Art, Biloxi, Mississippi
 Georgia O'Keeffe – Georgia O'Keeffe Museum, Santa Fe, New Mexico
 Pablo Picasso – see list of Picasso museums
 Júlio Pomar - Atelier-Museu Júlio Pomar, Lisbon, Portugal
 Roger Raveel Museum, Machelen-aan-de-Leie, Belgium
 Rembrandt – Rembrandt House Museum, Amsterdam
 Frederic Remington – Frederic Remington Art Museum, Ogdensburg, New York
 Diego Rivera - Pinacoteca Diego Rivera, Veracruz, Mexico, and Museo Mural Diego Rivera, Mexico City
 Norman Rockwell – Norman Rockwell Museum, Stockbridge, Massachusetts
 Auguste Rodin – Musée Rodin, Paris, the Rodin Museum, Philadelphia, Pennsylvania, the Museu Rodin Bahia, Bahia, Brazil
 Nicholas Roerich – Nicholas Roerich Museum, New York City
 Julio Romero de Torres - Julio Romero de Torres Museum, Córdoba, Spain
 Peter Paul Rubens - Rubenshuis, Antwerp, Belgium
 Charles Marion Russell - C.M. Russell Museum, Great Falls, Montana
 Augustus Saint-Gaudens - Saint-Gaudens National Historical Park, Cornish, New Hampshire
 John Soane – Sir John Soane's Museum, London
 Joaquín Sorolla - Sorolla Museum, Madrid
 Stanley Spencer - Stanley Spencer Gallery, Cookham, Berkshire
 Clyfford Still – Clyfford Still Museum, Denver, Colorado
 Franz Stuck - Villa Stuck, Munich, Germany
 Kenkichi Sugimoto – Sugimoto Art Museum, Mihama, Aichi, Japan
 Ruben Talberg – Talberg Museum, Offenbach, Germany
 Rufino Tamayo – Museo Rufino Tamayo, Mexico City
 Rudolph Tegner – Rudolph Tegner Museum, Dronningmølle, Denmark
 Steffen Thomas - Steffen Thomas Museum of Art, Buckhead, Georgia
 Bertel Thorvaldsen – Thorvaldsen Museum, Copenhagen
 Jean Tinguely – Museum Tinguely, Basel, Switzerland
 Henri de Toulouse-Lautrec - Musée Toulouse-Lautrec, Albi, France
 Cy Twombly – Cy Twombly Gallery of the Menil Collection, Houston, Texas
 Shoji Ueda – Shoji Ueda Museum of Photography, Saihaku-gun, Tottori, Japan
 Charles Umlauf - Umlauf Sculpture Garden and Museum, Austin, Texas
 Utagawa Hiroshige - Nakagawa-machi Batō Hiroshige Museum of Art, Nakagawa, Tochigi, Japan
 Vincent van Gogh – Van Gogh Museum, Amsterdam
 Andy Warhol – The Andy Warhol Museum, Pittsburgh, Pennsylvania, and the Andy Warhol Museum of Modern Art, Medzilaborce, Slovakia
 George Frederic Watts – Watts Gallery, Compton, Surrey, United Kingdom
 Brett Whiteley – Brett Whiteley Studio, Sydney, Australia 
 Jens Ferdinand Willumsen – J.F. Willumsens Museum, Frederikssund, Denmark
N.C. Wyeth - Brandywine River Museum of Art, Chadds Ford, Pennsylvania
 Marlene Tseng Yu – Marlene Yu Museum, Shreveport, Louisiana
 Ossip Zadkine – Musée Zadkine, Paris, France
 Anders Zorn - Zorn Collections, Mora, Sweden

See also
 :Category:Museums devoted to one artist
 List of art museums 
 List of most visited art museums
 List of largest art museums
 List of museums devoted to one photographer

References

Lists of art museums and galleries